Wisconsin Avenue is a major thoroughfare in Washington, D.C., and its Maryland suburbs.  The southern terminus begins in Georgetown just north of the Potomac River, at an intersection with K Street under the elevated Whitehurst Freeway.  The section of Wisconsin Avenue in Georgetown was called High Street before the street names in Georgetown were changed in 1895 to conform to those of the L'Enfant Plan for the federal city (although Georgetown predates the planned capital by half a century).

Route 

Originally a Native American trail, it was used by Europeans since the 1690s. From the Georgetown riverfront, Wisconsin Avenue climbs steeply north through Northwest D.C. (see picture above) along two travel lanes, with parked vehicles continuously filling both curb lanes.  The Avenue then passes through the neighborhoods of Glover Park, Cathedral Heights (next to the Washington National Cathedral), Cleveland Park, Tenleytown and Friendship Heights with its several broadcasting towers. While in Friendship Heights, Wisconsin Avenue intersects with Western Avenue (which forms much of the Northwest border of Washington, D.C.) and then crosses into Montgomery County, Maryland. In Maryland, the road is also alternatively known as Maryland Route 355. As Wisconsin Avenue passes through Bethesda it forms one of the main streets of the downtown area.

Just north of downtown Bethesda, at the intersection with Glenbrook Parkway, its name changes to "Rockville Pike".

Parallel transportation 

From the Tenleytown-AU station north, Wisconsin Avenue runs approximately parallel to the Red Line of the Washington Metro.

Transit service

Metrorail
Metrorail stations on or near Wisconsin Avenue are all served by the Red Line. They include:
 Tenleytown-AU
 Friendship Heights
 Bethesda

Metrobus
The following Metrobus routes travel along the street (listed from south to north):
 31, 33 (Friendship Heights Station to M St. NW)
 37 (Limited stop service from Friendship Heights Station to Massachusetts Ave.)
 96 (Woodley Rd. NW to Tenleytown-AU Station)
 H3, H4 (Porter St. NW to Tentleytown-AU Station)
 H2 (Van Ness St. NW to Tenleytown-AU Station)
 N2 (Friendship Heights Station to Nebraska Ave. NW)
 L2 (Friendship Heights Station to Bethesda Station (late night Friday & Saturday only))

DC Circulator
The D.C. Circulator's Georgetown-Union Station route travels along the street:
 West from K St. to 35th St.
 East from 35th St. to M St.

Ride On
The following Ride On routes travel along the street (listed from south to north):
 34 (Cedar Lane to Woodmont Ave., and later Bethesda station to Friendship Heights station)

Place in the National Highway System 

Wisconsin Avenue is part of the National Highway System as an arterial route from M Street to the Capital Beltway.

History 

Wisconsin Avenue follows the route of an ancient Native American trail. Between 1805 and 1820, it was reconstructed into a toll road to carry tobacco and other products between Georgetown and Frederick.  Starting around 1920, various sections of the road have been paved and widened to two, four, and as many as six lanes.

In 1864, General Jubal A. Early marched down this road from Monocacy Junction in an attempt to take Washington, D.C. that ended in the Battle of Fort Stevens.

Wisconsin Avenue was once U.S. Highway 240. Outside of the Beltway, U.S. Highway 240 was relocated to what is today Interstate 270. The highway was changed to I-70S with the opening of the Interstate Highway System in 1956.  Eventually, the entire route designation was decommissioned and was changed to what is now known as Maryland Route 355.

External links

Georgetown (Washington, D.C.)
Roads in Montgomery County, Maryland
Streets in Washington, D.C.